Raphael p’Mony Wokorach is a Roman Catholic prelate, who was appointed Bishop of the Diocese of Nebbi, in Uganda, on 31 March 2021.

Early life and priesthood
Wokorach was born on 21 January 1961, at Ojigo Village in Wadelai, in the then Diocese of Arua, in present-day Arua District in the West Nile sub-region, in the Northern Region of Uganda.

He attended Ragem Primary School, before entering the highly selective Saints Peter and Paul Minor (Preparatory) Seminary at Pokea, in Arua, studying Sciences, Mathematics, Social Studies and Latin from 1975 until 1979, for his O-Level education. He transferred to the all-boys' boarding school, St. Joseph’s College Ombaci, also in Arua, where he completed his A-Level education, graduating in 1982, with the equivalent of a high school diploma.

Between 1983 and 1987, Wokorach studied philosophy at Uganda Martyrs’ National Major Seminary Alokolum, in Gulu, Uganda. In 1987, he was awarded a Bachelor of Arts degree in Philosophy, by the Pontifical Urban University, in Rome. He continued with his studies in Kenya, graduating with a Master of Arts degree in Philosophy from the Catholic University of Eastern Africa in 1994. 

He is a member of the Comboni Missionaries of the Heart of Jesus (Latin: Missionarii Comboniani Cordis Iesu), also known as the Comboni Missionaries of the Sacred Heart, the Verona Fathers, or the Sons of the Sacred Heart of Jesus, and originally called the Sacred Heart of Jesus(Congregatio Filiorum S. Cordis Iesu), a male religious institute of papal law: the members of this congregation, known merely as Comboni, bear the letters MCCI. It was founded on June 1, 1867 by Italian priest Daniel Comboni.

Wokorach was ordained priest on 25 September 1993 at Wadelai Parish, in Arua Diocese, by Martin Luluga, the Bishop of Gulu at that time. He served as priest in the Roman Catholic Diocese of Nebbi, until 31 March 2021.

As bishop
He was appointed bishop on 31 March 2021 by Pope Francis. He replaced Bishop Sanctus Lino Wanok, who served as Bishop of Nebbi from 8 February 2011 until 23 November 2018, when he was transferred to Lira Diocese as Bishop. During the absence of a bishop at Nebbi (2018 to 2021), Monsignor Emmanuel Odaga served as the Diocesan Administrator. He is expected to be installed as Bishop of Nebbi Catholic Diocese on 14 August 2021.

Wokorach was consecrated bishop on 14 August 2021, at Immaculate Heart of Mary Cathedral, Nebbi, in the Roman Catholic Diocese of Nebbi by Archbishop John Baptist Odama, Archbishop of the Roman Catholic Archdiocese of Gulu, assisted by
Archbishop Luigi Bianco, Titular Archbishop of Falerone and Papal Nuncio to Uganda, Bishop Giuseppe Filippi, M.C.C.I., Bishop of the Roman Catholic Diocese of Kotido
and Bishop Sanctus Lino Wanok, Bishop of the Roman Catholic Diocese of Lira.

See also
 Uganda Martyrs
 Roman Catholicism in Uganda

References

External links
Rev. Fr. Raphael Wokorach Appointed New Bishop Nebbi Diocese As of 31 March 2021. 

1961 births
Living people
People from Arua District
People from Northern Region, Uganda
Catholic University of Eastern Africa alumni
Pontifical Urban University alumni
21st-century Roman Catholic archbishops in Uganda
People educated at St. Joseph's College Ombaci
Roman Catholic bishops of Nebbi